Eupithecia zagrosata is a moth in the family Geometridae. It is found in Iran (the Zagros Mountains).

The forewings are grey or dark grey with dark transverse lines. The hindwings are paler light grey with blackish grey, dark transverse lines.

Etymology
The species is named for the Zagros, the largest mountain range in Iran.

References

External links

Moths described in 2012
zagrosata
Moths of the Middle East